The 2030 United States census, known as "Census 2030", will be the twenty-fifth United States national census. National Census Day, the reference day used for the census, will be April 1, 2030.

Introduction
As required by the United States Constitution, the U.S. census has been conducted every 10 years since 1790. The 2020 census was the previous census completed. All persons in the U.S. age 18 years and older are legally obligated to answer census questions, and to do so truthfully (Title 13 of the United States Code).

Personally identifiable information will be available in 2102.

Phases

Early planning started in October 2018 and was followed by a design selection phase is currently under way. Public input was collected between August and November 2022 to inform the Census Bureau's decisions on the operational design of the 2030 Census, including which languages should be used to collect census data.

In January 2023, a notice in the Federal Register proposed separate checkboxes in the race or ethnicity question for "Hispanic or Latino" as well as "Middle Eastern or North African".

References

External links
 Official website of the 2030 Census

Census 2030
United States census
United States